Vitaliy Hoshkoderya (born 8 January 1988) is a professional Ukrainian footballer, who plays as a midfielder.

He is a son of Valeriy Hoshkoderya.

Career
He was born in Donetsk, Ukrainian SSR, and is a product of FC Shakhtar Donetsk training academy. His father Valeriy Hoshkoderya is a retired Shakhtar Donetsk player.

He was loaned to Volyn Lutsk in the Ukrainian Premier League from 30 August 2010.

References

External links

1988 births
Living people
Ukrainian footballers
Ukrainian expatriate footballers
Footballers from Donetsk
Association football defenders
FC Shakhtar-3 Donetsk players
FC Volyn Lutsk players
FC Olimpik Donetsk players
FC Kryvbas Kryvyi Rih players
FC Naftovyk-Ukrnafta Okhtyrka players
FC Shakhtar Donetsk players
FC Chornomorets Odesa players
FC Metalist 1925 Kharkiv players
FC Okzhetpes players
Ukrainian Premier League players
Ukrainian First League players
Ukrainian Second League players
Kazakhstan Premier League players
Ukrainian expatriate sportspeople in Kazakhstan
Expatriate footballers in Kazakhstan